The 2001 NAPA 500 was the 35th stock car race of the 2001 NASCAR Winston Cup Series and the 42nd iteration of the event. The race was held on Sunday, November 18, 2001, in Hampton, Georgia at Atlanta Motor Speedway, a  permanent asphalt quad-oval intermediate speedway. The race took the scheduled 325 laps to complete. On the final lap of the race, Jerry Nadeau, driving for Hendrick Motorsports, would run out of fuel heading into turn 3, leading to Joe Gibbs Racing driver Bobby Labonte stealing the victory away from Nadeau. The win was Labonte's 18th career NASCAR Winston Cup Series victory and his second and final victory of the season. To fill out the podium, Sterling Marlin, driving for Chip Ganassi Racing with Felix Sabates, and Kevin Harvick, driving for Richard Childress Racing, would finish second and third, respectively.

Meanwhile, fourth-place finisher, Hendrick Motorsports driver Jeff Gordon, would clinch the 2001 NASCAR Winston Cup Series championship after a dominant 2001 season, earning his fourth and final NASCAR Winston Cup Series championship.

Background 
Atlanta Motor Speedway (formerly Atlanta International Raceway) is a track in Hampton, Georgia, 20 miles (32 km) south of Atlanta. It is a 1.54-mile (2.48 km) quad-oval track with a seating capacity of 111,000. It opened in 1960 as a 1.5-mile (2.4 km) standard oval. In 1994, 46 condominiums were built over the northeastern side of the track. In 1997, to standardize the track with Speedway Motorsports' other two 1.5-mile (2.4 km) ovals, the entire track was almost completely rebuilt. The frontstretch and backstretch were swapped, and the configuration of the track was changed from oval to quad-oval. The project made the track one of the fastest on the NASCAR circuit.

Entry list 

 (R) denotes rookie driver.

Practice

First practice 
The first practice session was held on Friday, November 16, at 11:20 AM EST. The session would last for two hours.

Second practice 
The second practice session was held on Saturday, November 17, at 10:00 AM EST. The session would last for 45 minutes.

Third and final practice 
The final practice session, sometimes referred to as Happy Hour, was held on Saturday, November 17, at 11:15 AM EST. The session would last for 45 minutes.

Qualifying 
Qualifying was held on Friday, November 16, at 3:00 PM EST. Each driver would have two laps to set a fastest time; the fastest of the two would count as their official qualifying lap. Positions 1-36 would be decided on time, while positions 37-43 would be based on provisionals. Six spots are awarded by the use of provisionals based on owner's points. The seventh is awarded to a past champion who has not otherwise qualified for the race. If no past champ needs the provisional, the next team in the owner points will be awarded a provisional.

Eight drivers would fail to qualify: Mark Green, Robby Gordon, Jason Leffler, Kurt Busch, Rick Mast, Ron Hornaday Jr., Dave Marcis, and Frank Kimmel.

Full qualifying results

Race results

References 

2001 NASCAR Winston Cup Series
NASCAR races at Atlanta Motor Speedway
November 2001 sports events in the United States
2001 in sports in Georgia (U.S. state)